Brian Savage (born 1971) is a Canadian former ice hockey player.

Brian Savage may also refer to:
 Brian K. Savage (born 1955), Republican member of the Vermont House of Representatives
 Scalphunter (DC Comics)
 Brian Savage, former drummer for Underground Zerø